, known mononymously as Yuto, is a Japanese rapper, singer, songwriter and composer based in South Korea. He is a member of the South Korean boy group Pentagon, formed by Cube Entertainment.

Biography

Early life and education
Yuto was born on January 23, 1998, in Nagano, Japan. He is the youngest of a family of three children with one sister and one brother. He got interested in K-pop since he was in grade 4 elementary school. After seeing K-pop groups such as TVXQ and Girls' Generation together with his sister on television, he was fascinated with their vocal skills, synchronized dance, and visual.

In an interview with BuzzFeed Japan, he said "I was not interested in music. I was the type who don’t listen to music, and just played sports such as baseball and soccer. However, when I heard about K-pop for the first time, I got attracted and after that, gradually being more into it." After becoming a middle school student, he became a K-pop fan. He danced to K-pop choreography with friends together and uploaded choreography videos to the internet. Later, he applied to the global audition opened in Japan by a Korean entertainment company when he was in grade 2 middle school. However, he was rejected because he was too young. During the reading session set in the morning in his middle school, he studied Korean and imitated dancing while watching K-pop videos. People around him recognized his affection for K-pop. In the graduation article collection of his middle school yearbook, he wrote "I want to become a big star." He was the school baseball and soccer player and a member of dance club which he would perform on stage for his school festival every year.

At 15 years old, he moved to Korea after persuading his parents several times. He aimed to be the first Japanese male K-pop "[but] my skills was completely insufficient." During his trainee days, Yuto's grandfather had passed away. However, he continued his practice with his grandfather's encouragement letter. Yuto trained for 3 and a half years as a trainee before debuting with Pentagon.

Pre-debut and Pentagon Maker
Yuto was a former JYP Entertainment trainee. He passed "Cube Star World Audition" global selection and became a Cube trainee in 2014. In 2015, Yuto participated in 2015 Idol Star Athletics Ssireum Basketball Futsal Archery Championships. At the championship, Yuto teamed with Goaldae-Sliga alongside Doo-joon and Yoseob of Beast, and Roh Ji-hoon, and took the gold medal in the men futsal.

In 2016, Yuto joined as survival candidate in a South Korean television reality program Pentagon Maker, hosted by Cube Entertainment and co-produced by Mnet. Though he was initially in the bottom four in the first elimination, he was save in the ninth week after performing "Young" (Prod. by Dok2) with his team. On July 9, "Young" was released on various online music sites. In episode 9, week 10 of Pentagon Maker, Yuto performed Block B's "Very good" alongside Jinho and Wooseok for the 3 vs 3 vs 3 match, where the confirmed member were selected as unit leaders and each team includes the elimination candidates including Yuto. As a result of the final mission, Yuto's team won first place in the unit performance. Thus, he was excluded from the candidate for elimination after completing his Pentagraph and joined as Pentagon's 6th member. Before the group officially debuted, Yuto made his first cameo on Yeo One's web drama Spark, alongside fellow Pentagon members Hui, E'Dawn and Wooseok.

2016–present: Debut with Pentagon and solo activities

On October 10, 2016, Yuto officially debuted as a member of Pentagon with their first extended play Pentagon. He is the lead rapper and lead dancer in the group. Less than two months later, Yuto participated in Pentagon's second extended play Five Senses. He co-wrote the song "Engine", making this his first Pentagon's song after debuting as a Pentagon member. In 2017, he made a cameo in the drama Hello, My Twenties! 2 with his bandmates as a member of Asgard. On September 24, Yuto challenged his first role as the MC for Japan-Korea 10th Anniversary KMF2017 which was held at Yokohama Arena. In 2018, Yuto co-hosted 69th Sapporo Snow Fest 10th Anniversary K-POP FESTIVAL 2018 along with Monsta X's Hyungwon and Target's Woojin. The MCs were selected for being born in a year in which the Olympics took place, Yuto was born in 1998 during Nagano Winter Olympic. In June 2021, Yuto began hosting his own bimonthly segment on Mnet Japan's program Mnet BANG!.

Personal life
Yuto has expressed his fondness towards Shinee's song "Lucifer" in many of his interview. He also confessed that his role model is Taemin from the same group. Yuto is known to have a low-tone voice especially during rapping.

Discography

Other songs

Songwriting credits 

All credits are adapted from the Korea Music Copyright Association, unless stated otherwise.

Solo work

Pentagon albums/singles

Other works by Pentagon

Other artist

Filmography

Television series

Web dramas

Variety shows

Hosting

References

External links

 
 

1998 births
Living people
Cube Entertainment artists
Pentagon (South Korean band) members
Japanese K-pop singers
Japanese-language singers
Japanese male singer-songwriters
Japanese singer-songwriters
Japanese rappers

K-pop singers
Korean-language singers of Japan
21st-century Japanese singers
21st-century Japanese male singers
People from Nagano Prefecture
Musicians from Nagano Prefecture
People from Nagano (city)